Marketing intelligence (MI) is the everyday information relevant to a company’s markets, gathered and analyzed specifically for the purpose of accurate and confident decision-making in determining market opportunity, market penetration strategy, and market development metrics. Marketing intelligence is necessary when entering a foreign market.

Concept 
Marketing intelligence determines the intelligence needed, collects it by searching the environment and delivers it to marketing managers who need it. Marketing intelligence software can be deployed using an on-premises or software as a service (SaaS, or cloud-based) model. These systems take data from disparate data sources, like web analytics, business intelligence, call center and sales data, which often come separate reports, and put them into a single environment. In order to collect marketing intelligence, marketing managers must be in constant touch with relevant books, newspapers and trade publications. They must talk to various stakeholders like customers, distributors, and suppliers. In addition to this, they must also monitor social media and carry out online discussions. Marketing managers can design reports that correlate and visualize data coming from a variety of departments and sources (even, in some cases, external data). This allows them to see current key performance indicators in real-time (or as quickly as sources provide data) and analyze trends, rather than wait for analysts to deliver periodic reports.

Marketing intelligence systems are designed to be used by marketing managers and often viewed by employees throughout an organization. Notable systems on the market include Contify, Uptime, Leadtime, Pardot, Marketo, and Hubspot. They may have user interfaces that closely resemble consumer software than the software around individual data sources, which are designed for use by analysts. Business intelligence, for example, can collect highly accurate, timely, granular data, but often requires IT support to build and edit custom reports.

Organizationally, marketing intelligence can be the name of the department that performs both the market intelligence and competitor analysis roles. Business intelligence of any kind may also be their responsibility, in tandem with (or solely performed by) the Finance department, for measuring market share and setting growth targets, the mergers and acquisitions group for exploring acquisition opportunities, the legal department to protect the organization's assets or research and development for cross-company comparison of innovation trends and the discovery of opportunities through innovative differentiation.

Steps 
With the following steps being applied, a company's marketing intelligence system will prove to be beneficial to its effective functioning.

Train and Motivate Sales Force: A company's sales force can be an excellent source of information about the current trends in the market. They are the "intelligence gatherers" for the company. The acquired facts can be regarding the company's market offerings, whether any improvements are required or not or is there any opportunity for new products, etc. It can also provide a credible source to know about competitor activities, consumers, distributors, and retailers.
 Motivate Distributors, retailers, and other intermediaries to pass along important intelligence: Specialists are hired by companies to gather marketing intelligence. In order to measure the quality of production, the way the employees are behaving with customers, quality of facilities being provided; retailers and service providers send mystery shoppers. Firms can also assess the quality of customer experience with the shops with the use of mystery shoppers.
 Network Externally: Every firm must keep a tab on its competitors. Competitive intelligence describes the broader discipline of researching, analyzing and formulating data and information from the entire competitive environment of any organization. This can be done by purchasing the competitor's products, checking the advertising campaigns, the press media coverage, reading their published reports, etc. Competitive intelligence must be legal and ethical.
 Set up a customer advisory panel: Companies can set up panels consisting of customers. They can be the company's largest customers or representatives of customers or the most outspoken customers. Many business schools set up panels consisting of alumni who provide their knowledge and expertise and help in constituting the course curriculum.
 Optimal usage of Government data resources: Governments of almost all countries publish reports regarding the population trends, demographic characteristics, agricultural production and a lot of other such data.  All this data must be or can be referred to as base data. It can help in planning and formulating policies for the companies.
 Information bought from external suppliers: Certain agencies sell data that can be useful to other companies. For example, television channels will require information on the number of viewership, ratings of TV programs, etc. An agency that calculates this information and generates this data will provide it to companies that need it.
 Collect Competitive Intelligence through online customer feedback: The customer's view of a product is essential for any company. Ultimately it's the customer who's buying the product. Hence customer feedback must be taken. Online platforms like chat rooms, blogs, discussion forums, customer review boards can be used to generate customer feedback. This enables the firm to understand customer experiences and impressions. It becomes easier for companies to apply a structured system to do so as it can then scan out the relevant messages without much of a trouble.

See also 
 Marketing and artificial intelligence
 Media intelligence
 Customer Data Platform
 Market and Competitive Intelligence

References 
 Kotler, Keller, Koshy and Jha (2009). "Marketing Management, 13th Edition",Chapter 3, Page 64 to 67.
Forrestor Report on New Tech - Market and Competitive Intelligence Solutions, Q1 2019

Market research
Mass media monitoring